Sweden competed at the 1988 Summer Olympics in Seoul, South Korea. 185 competitors, 148 men and 37 women, took part in 113 events in 23 sports.

Medalists

Competitors
The following is the list of number of competitors in the Games.

Archery

The Swedish team continued their archery medal drought, though they took three top eight places in the women's individual, women's team, and men's team categories.

Women's individual competition:
 Jenny Sjöwall — Final (→ 5th place)
 Liselotte Andersson — Quarterfinal (→ 13th place)
 Carina Jonsson — Preliminary Round (→ 59th place)

Men's individual competition:
 Göran Bjerendal — Quarterfinal (→ 15th place)
 Mats Nordlander — Preliminary Round (→ 30th place)
 Gert Bjerendal — Preliminary Round (→ 35th place)

Women's team competition:
 Sjöwall, Andersson, and Jonsson — Final (→ 7th place)

Men's team competition:
 Bjerendal, Nordlander, and Bjerendal — Final (→ 8th place)

Athletics

Sven Nylander was on location and scheduled to start in men's 400m hurdles, but ended up not starting due to illness.

Men's Hammer Throw
 Tore Gustafsson
 Qualifying Heat — 76.44m
 Final — 74.24m (→ 11th place)

 Kjell Bystedt
 Qualifying Heat — no mark (→ did not advance)

Men's Javelin Throw
 Dag Wennlund
 Qualification — 79.66m
 Final — 78.30m (→ 8th place)

 Peter Borglund
 Qualification — 80.16m
 Final — 78.22m (→ 9th place)

Men's Decathlon 
 Mikael Olander — 7869 points (→ 17th place)
 100 metres — 11.46s
 Long Jump — 6.75m
 Shot Put — 16.07m
 High Jump — 2.00m
 400 metres — 51.28s
 110m Hurdles — 16.06s
 Discus Throw — 50.66m
 Pole Vault — 4.80m
 Javelin Throw — 72.80m
 1.500 metres — 5:02.42s

Men's 50 km Walk
 Bo Gustafsson
 Final — 3'44:49 (→ 7th place)

 Stefan Johansson
 Final — 3'53:34 (→ 20th place)

 Jan Staaf
 Final — DSQ (→ no ranking)

Women's Marathon 
 Evy Palm
 Final — 2"34.41 (→ 24th place)

Boxing

Canoeing

Cycling

Eight cyclists, five men and three women, represented Sweden in 1988.

Men's road race
 Michel Lafis
 Anders Jarl
 Raoul Fahlin

Men's team time trial
 Björn Johansson
 Jan Karlsson
 Michel Lafis
 Anders Jarl

Women's road race
 Marie Höljer — 2:00:52 (→ 7th place)
 Paula Westher — 2:00:52 (→ 26th place)
 Marianne Berglund — 2:00:52 (→ 44th place)

Diving

Joakim Andersson

Equestrianism

Fencing

Eleven fencers, 10 men and one woman, represented Sweden in 1988.

Men's foil
 Ola Kajbjer
 Eric Strand
 Thomas Åkerberg

Men's team foil
 Peter Åkerberg, Thomas Åkerberg, Ola Kajbjer, Eric Strand, Per Täckenström

Men's épée
 Jerri Bergström
 Péter Vánky
 Otto Drakenberg

Men's team épée
 Johan Bergdahl, Jerri Bergström, Otto Drakenberg, Ulf Sandegren, Péter Vánky

Women's foil
 Kerstin Palm

Football

Summary

Gymnastics

Handball

Summary

Judo

Modern pentathlon

Three male pentathletes represented Sweden in 1988.

Men's Individual Competition:
 Svante Rasmuson — 4987 pts (→ 22nd place)
 Jan-Erik Danielsson — 4956 pts (→ 25th place)
 Roderick Martin — 4262 pts (→ 57th place)

Men's Team Competition:
 Rasmuson, Danielsson, and Martin — 14205 pts (→ 12th place)

Rowing

Sailing

Shooting

Swimming

Men's 50m freestyle
 Göran Titus
 Heat — 23.44
 B-Final — 23.28 (→ 9th place)

 Per Johansson
 Heat — 23.12
 B-Final — 23.37 (→ 10th place)

Men's 100m freestyle
 Per Johansson
 Heat — 50.22
 Final — 50.35 (→ 7th place)

 Tommy Werner
 Heat — 50.45
 Final — 50.54 (→ 8th place)

Men's 200m freestyle
 Anders Holmertz
 Heat — 1:49.28
 Final — 1:47.89 (→  Silver Medal)

 Tommy Werner
 Heat — 1:51.96 (→ did not advance, 21st place)

Men's 400m freestyle
 Anders Holmertz
 Heat — 3:50.06
 Final — 3:51.04 (→ 8th place)

 Henrik Jangvall
 Heat — 3:57.41 (→ did not advance, 21st place)

Men's 1500m freestyle
 Stefan Persson
 Heat — 15:24.33 (→ did not advance, 17th place)

Men's 200m Butterfly
 Christer Wallin
 Heat — 2:03.79 (→ did not advance, 26th place)

Men's 4 × 100 m freestyle relay
 Tommy Werner, Richard Milton, Joakim Holmqvist, and Göran Titus
 Heat — 3:23.09
 Per Johansson, Tommy Werner, Joakim Holmqvist, and Göran Titus
 Final — 3:21.07 (→ 5th place)

Men's 4 × 200 m freestyle relay
 Tommy Werner, Christer Wallin, Henrik Jangvall, and Michael Söderlund
 Heat — 7:23.82
 Anders Holmertz, Tommy Werner, Michael Söderlund, and Christer Wallin
 Final — 7:19.10 (→ 6th place)

Women's 50m freestyle
 Helena Åberg
 Heat — 26.67 (→ did not advance, 23rd place)

 Karin Furuhed
 Heat — 26.85 (→ did not advance, 24th place)

Women's 100m freestyle
 Eva Nyberg
 Heat — 57.57 (→ did not advance, 21st place)

 Karin Furuhed
 Heat — 57.97 (→ did not advance, 27th place)

Women's 200m freestyle
 Suzanne Nilsson
 Heat — 2:03.32 (→ did not advance, 18th place)

Women's 100m Backstroke
 Johanna Larsson
 Heat — 1:05.10 (→ did not advance, 22nd place)

Women's 200m Backstroke
 Johanna Larsson
 Heat — 2:18.01 (→ 14th place)
 B-Final — DSQ (→ no ranking)

Women's 100m Butterfly
 Agneta Eriksson
 Heat — 1:03.45 (→ did not advance, 22nd place)

Women's 200m Individual Medley
 Anette Philipsson
 Heat — 2:18.86
 B-Final — 2:19.35 (→ 12th place)

Women's 400m Individual Medley
 Anette Philipsson
 Heat — 4:53.58
 B-Final — 4:52.77 (→ 13th place)

Women's 4 × 100 m freestyle relay
 Agneta Eriksson, Karin Furuhed, Suzanne Nilsson, and Eva Nyberg
 Heat — 3:50.50 (→ did not advance, 9th place)

Women's 4 × 100 m medley relay
 Johanna Larsson, Anna-Karin Persson, Agneta Eriksson, and Eva Nyberg
 Heat — 4:17.72 (→ did not advance, 11th place)

Synchronized swimming

One synchronized swimmer represented Sweden in 1988.

Women's solo
 Marie Jacobsson

Table tennis

Tennis

Men's Singles Competition
 Stefan Edberg →  Bronze Medal
 First round — Defeated Horst Skoff (Austria) 7-6 6-2 6-3
 Second round — Defeated Agustín Moreno (Mexico) 6-2 7-6 6-0
 Third round — Defeated Jakob Hlasek (Switzerland) 6-2 6-4 7-6
 Quarterfinals — Defeated Paolo Canè (Italy) 6-1 7-5 6-4
 Semifinals — Lost to Miloslav Mečíř (Czechoslovakia) 6-3 0-6 6-1 4-6 2-6

 Anders Järryd
 First round — Defeated Martin Laurendeau (Canada) 7-6 4-6 7-5 7-5
 Second round — Defeated Andrew Castle (Great Britain) 6-0 6-3 6-1
 Third round — Lost to Carl-Uwe Steeb (Germany) 6-2 5-7 3-6 5-7

Men's Doubles Competition
 Stefan Edberg and Anders Järryd →  Bronze Medal
 First Round — Defeated Eric Jelen and Carl Uwe Steeb (West Germany) 6-4 4-6 6-4 6-2
 Second Round — Defeated Mark Gurr and Philip Tuckniss (Zimbabwe) 6-0 6-1 6-4
 Quarterfinals — Defeated Darren Cahill and John Fitzgerald (Australia) 6-3 6-4 6-3
 Semifinals — Lost to Emilio Sánchez and Sergio Casal (Spain) 4-6 6-1 3-6 3-6

Women's Singles Competition
 Catarina Lindqvist
 First Round — Defeated Kumiko Okamoto (Japan) 7-6 7-5
 Second Round — Defeated Nathalie Tauziat (France) 2-6 6-3 6-4
 Third Round — Lost to Manuela Maleeva (Bulgaria) 1-6 0-6

Volleyball

Summary

Men's team competition
Preliminary round (group A)
 Defeated South Korea (3-2)
 Lost to Soviet Union (0-3)
 Lost to Italy (2-3)
 Lost to Brazil (1-3)
 Defeated Bulgaria (3-0)
Classification Matches
 5th/8th place: Lost to the Netherlands (2-3)
 7th/8th place: Defeated France (3-2) → Seventh place

Team roster
Urban Lennartsson
Janni Kalmazidis
Jan Hedengard
Mats Karlsson
Tomas Hoszek
Anders Lundmark
Per-Anders Saaf
Bengt Gustafsson
Hakan Björne
Lars Nilsson
Peter Tholse
Patrik Johansson
Head coach: Anders Kristiansson

Weightlifting

Wrestling

References

Nations at the 1988 Summer Olympics
1988
Summer Olympics